Stephanie Zimbalist (born October 8, 1956) is an American actress best known for her role as Laura Holt in the NBC detective series Remington Steele.

Background 

Stephanie Zimbalist was born in New York City, the daughter of Loranda Stephanie (née Spalding) and actor Efrem Zimbalist Jr., who helmed the television series 77 Sunset Strip and The FBI as well as theatrical films. The family soon moved to Los Angeles, where Stephanie grew up. She was educated at the Marlborough School (Los Angeles) and graduated from Foxcroft School in Middleburg, Virginia. She attended the Juilliard School before commencing her acting career.

Zimbalist's paternal grandfather, Efrem Zimbalist, born in Rostov-on-Don, Russia, was a symphony conductor, concert violinist and music teacher at the Curtis Institute in Philadelphia, and composer. Her paternal grandmother, Alma Gluck, born in Romania, was a leading soprano of her day.
Zimbalist's aunt, Marcia Davenport, was a prominent author, music journalist and historian.

Acting career

Television and film career
Zimbalist's early television and movie appearances include The Gathering (1977, with Edward Asner), In the Matter of Karen Ann Quinlan (1977), Forever (1978), The Magic of Lassie (1978), Long Journey Back (TV, 1978), The Triangle Factory Fire Scandal (1979), The Awakening (1980, with Charlton Heston), The Golden Moment (1980), in which she played a Soviet Olympic gymnast, The Babysitter (1980) and Tomorrow's Child (TV, 1982). She co-starred with her father, Efrem Zimbalist Jr., in the tragic 1979 TV movie The Best Place to Be.

Another early role for Zimbalist was that of Elly Zendt in the mini-series Centennial, based on James Michener's epic novel of the same name, which was first televised on NBC between October 1978 and February 1979. She also guest starred as Josephine "Josie" Collins in the television series Family episode "Ballerina" (1979).

In her TV work, Zimbalist is best known in the TV role of sleuth Laura Holt in the NBC series Remington Steele (1982–87) opposite Pierce Brosnan and Doris Roberts, on which her father also guest-starred.

Since then, Zimbalist has taken leading roles in several television movies such as The Man in the Brown Suit (1988), the Emmy Award winning Caroline? (1990), The Great Elephant Escape (1995), and some guest roles in television series such as Touched by an Angel and Diagnosis Murder.

Theater
In 1979, she appeared as Miranda in John Hirsch's production of The Tempest with Anthony Hopkins (as Prospero), Brent Carver, and Michael Bond at the Mark Taper Forum in Los Angeles.

Zimbalist played opposite Tommy Tune in the touring musical My One and Only, taking the featured role of "Edith Herbert". She has made several appearances with the Rubicon Theatre Company in Ventura, California, winning the local critics' "Robby Award" for Best Actress in a Drama in The Rainmaker, at the Rubicon community theatre in 2001. Throughout the 2000s, Zimbalist took roles in plays concerning nineteenth-century artists including Chopin, Tchaikovsky and Van Gogh.

She also played Christa McAuliffe in the play Defying Gravity in 2003, written by Jane Anderson.

In 2009 she portrayed actress Katharine Hepburn in Tea at Five.

Other work

Zimbalist has also released audiobooks, including The Girls, which won a Listen-Up award in 2006, and Queen of the Underworld.

She appeared in the 2006 documentary Christa McAuliffe: Reach for the Stars.

Stage roles

 Gypsy (1969)
 Stars & Stripes (1970)
 Little Mary Sunshine (1971)
 Peter Pan (1974)
 Kiss Me Kate (1976)
 Festival (1979)
 The Tempest (1979)
 The Babysitter (1980)
 American Mosaic (1982)
 The Cherry Orchard (1983)
 Barbarians (1986)
 Summer & Smoke (1986)
 My One & Only (1987)
 Carousel (1988)
 The Baby Dance (1990–1991)
 The Threepenny Opera (1992)
 The Philadelphia Story (1992–1993)
 The Crimson Thread (1994)
 AdWars (1995)
 Sylvia (1996–1997)
 Wonderful Town (1997)
 Mr. Bundy (1998)
 The Gregory Peck Reading Series (1998)
 Denial (1999)
 Far East (1999)
 14th Annual Tennessee Williams / New Orleans Literary Festival (2000)
 Side Man (2000)
 Accomplice (2000)
 The Rainmaker (2000–2001)
 Walking Wounded (2000)
 A Cowardly Cavalcade (2000)
 The Gregory Peck Reading Series (2001)
 15th Annual Tennessee Williams/New Orleans Literary Festival (2001)
 16th Annual Tennessee Williams/New Orleans Literary Festival (2002)
 The Cherry Orchard (2002)
 Dancing At Lughnasa (2003)
 Tall Tales (2003)
 Romantique (2003)
 Defying Gravity (2003)
 Follies (2004)
 Vincent in Brixton (2004)
 The Night of the Iguana (2004)
 Confidentially Chaikovski (2005)
 Theater 150's 10-Minute Play Festival (2006)
 Mesmeric Mozart (2006)
 20th Annual Tennessee Williams/New Orleans Literary Festival (2006)
 Tea At Five (2006, 2009, 2010, 2012)
 The Memory of Water (2007)
 Hamlet (2007)
 A Little Night Music (2007), (2013)
 You Can't Take It With You (2007)
 22nd Annual Tennessee Williams/New Orleans Literary Festival (2008)
 The Spin Cycle (2008)
 The Price (2009)
 Truth and Justice (2010)
 The Subject Was Roses (2011)
 Steel Magnolias (2011, 2013)
 The Lion in Winter (2011)
 Sex and Education (2014)
 Living on Love (2015)

Filmography

Film

Television

References

External links

1956 births
Living people
People from Manhattan
Juilliard School alumni
American stage actresses
American television actresses
Actresses from New York City
Curtis family
20th-century American actresses
21st-century American actresses
Actresses from Los Angeles
Stephanie
Foxcroft School alumni